Nkhiphitheni Matombo (born 31 January 1977) is a South African footballer. He competed in the men's tournament at the 2000 Summer Olympics.

References

External links
 

1977 births
Living people
South African soccer players
Olympic soccer players of South Africa
Footballers at the 2000 Summer Olympics
People from Thulamela Local Municipality
Association football midfielders
Sportspeople from Limpopo
Dynamos F.C. (South Africa) players
Manning Rangers F.C. players
Black Leopards F.C. players